Veronica Maria Cäcilia Ferres (born 10 June 1965) is a German film, television, and stage actress. Her 2007 portrayal of Sara Bender in Die Frau vom Checkpoint Charlie, based on the true story of Jutta Fleck, earned her the award for Best Actress at the Deutscher Fernsehpreis (German Television Awards).

Early life
Ferres was born in Solingen. She grew up as the youngest child and only daughter of Peter Ferres, a coal and potato merchant, and his wife Katharina.

She completed her Abitur at the Gymnasium Schwertstrasse in Solingen, and then completed a German, theatre studies and psychology degree at the Ludwig Maximilian University of Munich.

Career

Her awards include the Grimme-Preis, the German Television Award, the Bavarian TV Award, the Golden Camera Award, and the Bambi Award. She played the female lead in Jedermann (Everyman), the traditional opening play of the Salzburg Festival, considered the highest honor in German stagecraft.

In 2013, Ferres shot the international feature Hector and the Search for Happiness with Simon Pegg and Jean Reno, and played the main role in the feature film Casanova Variations, again with John Malkovich. Her 13th international production, The Devil's Violinist, was released theatrically in late 2013. In 2015, she starred opposite Nicolas Cage in the thriller Pay the Ghost, directed by Uli Edel. In 2016, she had the leading role in Werner Herzog's film Salt and Fire, co-starring Michael Shannon and Gael García Bernal. Ferres also co-starred in The Comedian, her 17th English feature film, along with Robert De Niro, Leslie Mann, and Danny DeVito. In November 2022, Ferres was cast in the upcoming Red Sonja remake, as Ashera and the mother of Red Sonja.

Ferres founded her own production company, Construction Film GmbH, in 2012.

Personal life

Ferres was in a relationship with Helmut Dietl from 1990 to 1999. They collaborated on movies like Schtonk! (1991),  (1997),  (1999) and many others. In February 2000, they announced their separation. She has one daughter, Lilly Krug, with her ex-husband Martin Krug. The marriage lasted from 2001 until their divorce in 2010. In 2014, Ferres married Carsten Maschmeyer.

Filmography

Television

Film

Awards

 2013: Hadassah-Award "Citizen of the World" for longstanding engagement for Hadassah
 2013: Cinema for Peace Award against anti-Semitism and hatred of foreigners
 2013: Oldenburg Film Festival - Star of Excellence - Walk of Fame
 2011: Boston Jewish Film Festival - Saviors in the Night - Winner of Audience Award
 2011: Premio Bacco
 2010: SIGNIS Award at the International Film Festival DC in Washington for Saviors in the Night
 2009: Steiger Award in the category Film
 2008: Jupiter in the category Best TV-production for Die Frau vom Checkpoint Charlie
 2008: Deutscher Fernsehpreis in the category Best actress for Die Frau vom Checkpoint Charlie
 2007: "Hans-Rosenthal-Ehrenpreis" for her encouragement for her charity project "Power-Child"
 2007: Book of the Month - The book No, I don't go with strangers! was chosen as "Book of the month" of March 2007 by the "Deutsche Akademie für Kinder-und Jugendliteratur e.V."
 2007: "Bad Iburger" Children's Literary PrizeE for her book No, I don't go with strangers!
 2006: "Bavarian Merit Award" for her extraordinary achievements and dedication for Bavaria
 2006: "Goldene Feder" Award, best actress
 2005:	Best Actress Award "Bambi" in Germany for her excellent career in movies, on television and on stage
 2005:	"DIVA - HALL OF FAME - German Award"
 2004:	"Bavarian TV Award" for Anna's Return, Forever Lost and Stronger than Death
 2002: EMMY - Best film/serial for The Manns
 2002:	"Golden Grimme" Award for The Manns
 2002:	"Golden Camera" Award, best actress of feature film and TV movie in Germany
 2002:	"Bavarian TV" Award for The Manns
 2002:	"ROMY" Award, most popular actress in Austria
 1999:	Best Actress Award for The Bride, 9th International Film-Festival, Pescara, Italy
 1998:	"Golden Camera" Award, best actress of feature film and TV movie in Germany for Rossini
 1992:	Best Actress Award "Bambi" in Germany for Schtonk

Nominations 

 2009: German Television Award - Best mini-series for The Godmother
 2008: German Television Award - Best TV-movie for The Woman from Checkpoint Charlie and The Miracle of Berlin
 2008: Emmy - TV-movie for The Miracle of Berlin
 2008: Festival in Canada/BANFF - Best foreign language film for The Woman from Checkpoint Charlie
 2007: German Television Award for best actress in a leading role and best TV-movie Snow in December
 2007: Goldene Henne Award for best actress
 2007: Golden Camera Award - Best German TV-movie for Destined to witness
 2007: Bambi - For the TV-event of the year 2007 for The Woman from Checkpoint Charlie
 1998: Adolf Grimme Award for her role in The Naughty Woman and in The Chaos Queen
 1998: Tele Star - Best actress in a movie made for TV – The Naughty Woman
 1992: Oscar - Best foreign language film for Schtonk (role: Martha)

References

External links 

  
 
 

German television actresses
German film actresses
1965 births
Living people
People from Solingen
21st-century German actresses
20th-century German actresses
Ludwig Maximilian University of Munich alumni